Ask No Questions is a British game show that originally aired as a regional programme for Yorkshire Television in 1986 on Saturdays, then it became networked for most ITV regions in 1987.

Transmissions

Regional transmissions information

1986
The first series only aired in the Yorkshire region on Saturdays.

1987
The second series aired in the rest of the regions, but it was not networked:
 Border, HTV, Tyne Tees and Yorkshire: Started on 27 March and finished on 3 June. Mondays, Wednesdays and Fridays at 5:15pm.
 LWT: Started on 27 March and finished on 28 August. Fridays at 5:15pm. Not all episodes were broadcast. 
 UTV: Started on 27 March and finished on mid-July. ??? at 5:15pm.
 Scottish: Started on 9 April and finished in August. at 3:00pm/3:30pm.
 Anglia: Started on April and finished on May. ??? at 9:50am.
 Grampian: Started on 19 August and finished on 24 September. Wednesday to Friday at 5.10pm before switching to 3.00pm for the last 2 weeks
 TVS and Channel Television: Weekly  at 3:00pm.
 Central, Granada and TSW: Did not air the series.

External links
.

1986 British television series debuts
1987 British television series endings
1980s British game shows
ITV game shows
Television series by ITV Studios
Television series by Yorkshire Television